Long life may refer to:

 Longevity, life expectancy, or referring to long-lived members of a population
 Long Life, a 1978 reggae album by Prince Far I
 Longlife, a transnational project in the Baltic Region
 Product life/Durable goods

See also
 
 Lifelong learning
 Ultra-high-temperature processing